The Russian route A121, also known as the Sortavala Highway, is a Russian federal highway from Saint Petersburg to R21 highway in the Republic of Karelia. On the route Saint Petersburg – Sortavala – R21 "Kola" its length is 448 km. In 2017 a 54-km-long road section to Vyartsilya and Finland–Russia border became a part of the A121 highway increasing the total length of the Sortavala Highway to 502 km.

Gallery

References 

Roads in Leningrad Oblast
Roads in the Republic of Karelia